Tjeerd is a masculine given name of West Frisian origin that is common in the Netherlands. Like Tjaard, the name is derived from Germanic Thiadward ("strong among/protector of the people"). Notable people with the name include:

 Tjeerd van Albada (born 1936), Dutch astronomer
  (1923–2010), Dutch-born American geologist and oceanographer
 Tjeerd Boersma (1915–1985), Dutch sprinter
 Tjeerd Borstlap (born 1955), Dutch field hockey player
 Tjeerd Bottema (1884–1978), Dutch painter, illustrator and book cover designer
 Tjeerd van Dekken (born 1967), Dutch Labour Party politician
 Tjeerd Korf (born 1983), Dutch footballer
 Tjeerd Oosterhuis (born 1971), Dutch musician, songwriter and producer
 Tjeerd Pasma (1904–1944), Dutch modern pentathlete
 Tjeerd Daniel van Scheltinga (1914–1994), Dutch chess master

See also 
 Asteroid 10435 Tjeerd, named after Tjeerd van Albada

References 

Dutch masculine given names